Lenny Castro (born September 19, 1956) is an American studio percussionist from the Los Angeles area.

Early life 
Castro was born and raised in New York City to parents of Puerto Rican descent. His father, Hector Castro, was a keyboardist for Latin artists such as Johnny Pacheco. Castro attended the High School of Music & Art where he studied classical percussion.

Career 
After graduating high school and playing in local bands around New York City, he was discovered by singer Melissa Manchester at age 19 and went on tour as her percussionist. Castro later moved to Los Angeles with Manchester where he was introduced to producer Richard Perry. Perry had him play for Diana Ross on her album Baby It's Me where Castro met session drummer Jeff Porcaro.

Castro was then invited to join the band Toto by Porcaro for their debut album tour, later joining them in the studio for subsequent releases. Among his contributions to the band was for their hit single "Africa", where he played the ethnic percussion heard on the track.

As a freelance musician, Castro has recorded with several other musicians, including Stevie Nicks, Joe Sample, and Eric Clapton, the latter of whom he played with for the Grammy-winning song "Tears in Heaven".

Castro was nominated for Best Contemporary Jazz Album at the 46th Annual Grammys for the album Rural Renewal as part of The Crusaders.

References

External links 

 Official website
 Lenny Castro at AllMusic

Conga players
Jazz percussionists
Living people
1956 births